V883 Orionis is a protostar in the constellation of Orion. It is associated with IC 430 (Haro 13A), a peculiar Hα object surveyed by Guillermo Haro in 1952.

V883 Orionis, like most protostars, is surrounded by a circumstellar disc of dust. The dust has a water snow-line, a certain distance where the stellar irradiance from the star is low enough that water can freeze to snow. The water snow-line was directly imaged by ALMA, when a stellar outburst increased the amount of insolation and pushed the line out farther.

Gallery

References 

Orion (constellation)
Orion molecular cloud complex
FU Orionis stars
Orionis, V883